John Huyler (April 9, 1808 – January 9, 1870) was an American Democratic Party politician who represented  in the United States House of Representatives for one term from 1857 to 1859.

Early life and career
Born in New York City on April 9, 1808, Huyler attended the common schools at Tenafly, New Jersey. He apprenticed as a mason and later engaged in contracting and building in New York City until 1846.

He moved to New Jersey and engaged in agricultural pursuits at Pollifly, Lodi Township. He settled in the village of Hackensack, about 1855, and engaged in the mercantile and lumber business. He served as president of the Bergen County Board of Chosen Freeholders. He served as member of the New Jersey General Assembly from 1850 to 1852, and served as its speaker in 1852. He served as judge of the Court of Errors and Appeals 1853-1857.

Congress
In 1856 Judge Huyler was elected as a Democrat to the Thirty-fifth Congress in a district which comprises Bergen, Morris, Passaic and Sussex Counties; serving in office from March 4, 1857 to March 3, 1859. He was an unsuccessful candidate as a Lecompton Democrat for reelection in 1858 to the Thirty-sixth Congress.

Later career and death
After leaving Congress, he resumed the lumber business. He was assassinated in Hackensack on January 9, 1870, and was interred in New York Cemetery at Hackensack.

External links

John Huyler at The Political Graveyard

1808 births
1870 deaths
1870 murders in the United States
Assassinated American politicians
Democratic Party members of the New Jersey General Assembly
County commissioners in New Jersey
New Jersey state court judges
Politicians from Hackensack, New Jersey
People from Tenafly, New Jersey
Speakers of the New Jersey General Assembly
Burials in New Jersey
Democratic Party members of the United States House of Representatives from New Jersey
People murdered in New Jersey
19th-century American politicians
19th-century American judges
Assassinated American former elected officials